Manea  is a village and civil parish in the District of Fenland, Isle of Ely, Cambridgeshire, England.

The population (including Welches Dam) of the civil parish at the 2011 census was 2,088.

Landmarks are Manea railway station and RSPB Welches Dam nature reserve on the Ouse Washes.

The village's brass band, the Manea Silver Band, was formed in 1882; it meets at Manea Royal British Legion. Manea men's football team compete in local leagues and cup competitions.

History
Stonea Camp, an Iron Age hill fort is located approximately 1 mile west of the village.

Manea was once a hamlet in the parish of Coveney. In the seventeenth century, as part of a programme to drain the Fens, Charles I planned to build a new town and summer palace, to be called Charlemont. The scheme was opposed by local residents, including Oliver Cromwell, the MP of nearby Cambridge, who called the scheme "contrary to the law of God and nature".

The village's Church of England parish church is dedicated to St Nicholas and was built in 1875 to replace a building dating from 1791. It is a Grade II listed building.

Manea Colony
The Manea Colony was set up in the 1830s at Manea Fen as an experimental Utopian community but failed after a couple of years. The buildings were built with bricks from the colony's brickworks and slate for roofing. Welsh slate from Porthmadog was already arriving at the Port of Wisbech and King's Lynn by 1830.
The colony produced a newspaper the Working Bee on their own press.
On 16 February 1841 William Hodson published a notice stating that "The Late Friendly Society, called 'Manea Fen Colony' has been legally dissolved" in the Cambridge Chronicle of 20 February 1841. A model of the colony and copies of the Working Bee are on display at Octavia Hill's Birthplace House, Wisbech.

The Leicester Mercury on 24 April 1841 published details of a trial at Isle of Ely Quarter Sessions of 7 April. William Hodson was fined £10 and Thomas Golding £1 for having on 13 February assaulted Maria Ward, a candidate for admission to the colony.

William Hodson emigrated and died on 18 April 1880 at Janesville, Wisconsin, US.
In June 1904 a smallholding in the colony, comprising 32a. 0r. 15p. with 5a. 3r. 24p. of fishing pits, occupied by Thomas Rolfe, was knocked down to S. H. Farrington of March for £1240.
The Colony Farm 114a. 3r. 35p. with house, cottages, barn, and other farm-buildings, occupied by Samuel Dunhour, was withdrawn at £4020. F. J. Wise was solicitor to the vendors (the trustees of the late Mrs M. A. Wise).

During September and October 2016 the Cambridge Archaeological Unit (CAU) followed up geophysics surveys by Fenland Archaeological Society (FenArch) and conducted fieldwork as part of a HLF-funded project.

References

External links

Manea Parish Council

Villages in Cambridgeshire
Civil parishes in Cambridgeshire
Fenland District